Metropolitan Mall is a shopping and entertainment center in Bekasi, Indonesia. It comprises two buildings, the Metropolitan Mall 1 and 2. Mall 2 opened in 2005.

References

Buildings and structures in West Java
Shopping malls in Indonesia
Tourist attractions in West Java